Meigs High School is a public high school in Pomeroy, Ohio, United States.  It is one of four high schools in Meigs County.  The school mascot is the Marauders.  Meigs High School is the creation of several school districts within Meigs County including Middleport, Pomeroy, Bedford, Northwestern, and Salem.  Consolidation took place between the years 1965 and 1967 with construction of the new school beginning in the summer of 1968. The current school opened in 1970, and is still in use today.

Athletics

The Marauders belong to the Ohio High School Athletic Association (OHSAA) and the Tri-Valley Conference, a 16-member athletic conference located in southeastern Ohio.  The conference is divided into two divisions based on school size.  The Ohio Division features the larger schools, including Meigs, and the Hocking Division features the smaller schools. Meigs High School is the only high school within a 100-mile radius to have random drug testing.

In its first year of participation as the Marauders, Meigs won the SEOAL Football Championship with a 9-1 record.  Their only loss that year was an 8-0 setback to powerhouse Ironton.  The Marauders have won five total football championships. (1967, 1986, 1987, 1996, 1998)  The 1986 team holds the distinction as being the only team in school history to complete a season undefeated at 10-0.

Ohio High School Athletic Association State Championships
 Boys Baseball – 1957* 
 *Title won by Middleport High School prior to consolidation into Meigs HS.

Meigs Marauder Music Program
 Meigs Marauder Marching Band is directed by Toney Dingess, assisted by Dave Deem and Nick Michael, with color guard by Jamie Deem.
 Meigs Concert Band is directed by Toney Dingess

Marching Shows

1998-Magical Mystery Tour
1999-Big Bad VooDoo Daddy
2005-Paul Simon Show
2006-Music Of Ray Charles
2007-Jazz N' Blues featuring Moonlight Serenade, Take the "A" Train, Sing, Sing, Sing, Blues In The Night.
2008-Rocks This Town featuring Rock This Town, Sing Sang Sung, and Big Noise From Winnetka.
2009-Marauders Go To Birdland featuring Birdland, It Don't Mean A Thing (If It Ain't Got That Swing), and Swing Swing Swing.
2010-Ellington In Motion featuring Take the "A" Train, Satin Doll, Caravan, and It Don't Mean A Thing (If It Ain't Got That Swing).
2016-Remembrance featuring In The Stone, America the Beautiful, An American Elegy, and My Country Tis of Thee
The Marauder Band won Grand Champion in 1999 with their "Big Bad Voodoo Daddy" show, in the Tri-State Marching Band Festival competition at Marshall University.  They also won Grand Champion at Marietta in 2013 with their show, "Music of the Beatles". The Marauder band participated in the Memorial Day Parade in Washington, DC in May 2014.
Meigs High School also offers a choir class, which is also instructed by Toney Dingess.

Notable alumni
Bethany Williams- Playboy Centerfold August 2012 and current model
 Mike Bartrum, former American football long snapper and tight end in the National Football League, played for the Philadelphia Eagles.

See also
Ohio High School Athletic Conferences

References

External links
 District Website

High schools in Meigs County, Ohio
Ohio high school sports conferences
Public high schools in Ohio
Pomeroy, Ohio
1970 establishments in Ohio